Jeanne Atherden is a Bermudian politician and was the Leader of the Opposition in the House of Assembly of Bermuda until she resigned in September 2018. She became opposition leader after winning the party leadership of the largest opposition party, the One Bermuda Alliance, in November 2017. In 2008 she was appointed to serve as a Senator and since 2013 has served as an MP for Pembroke West.

References

One Bermuda Alliance politicians
Leaders of the Opposition (Bermuda)
Bermudian women in politics
Year of birth missing (living people)
Living people